The Myx Music Award for Favorite International Music Video is one of the awards handed out at the yearly Myx Music Award. It was first awarded in 2006 and presented to The Pussycat Dolls for their song Don't Cha. The Wonder Girls, Super Junior, 2NE1 and BTS are the only K-pop acts to be nominated in this category. A separate category was made to honor K-pop artists. Super Junior was first winning K-pop artist. One Direction was first winning British artist. BTS is the most awarded K-Pop artist. Taylor Swift and BTS are the most awarded artist in this category.

Recipients

Multiple wins and nominations

References

Myx Music Awards
Philippine music awards
Music video awards